The Taoyuan Arts Center is a performance center in Taoyuan District, Taoyuan City, Taiwan located in Taoyuan Zhongzheng Arts and Cultural Business District.

History
The center was opened in 2010.

Architecture
The building was constructed using aluminum alloy with sleek design into the sky. Glass windows stacked in lattice-style layers.

Notable events
 47th Golden Horse Awards

Transportation
The center is accessible by walking 3.5km (2.2 miles) northwest of Taoyuan Station of the Taiwan Railways Administration.

See also
 List of tourist attractions in Taiwan
 Taoyuan Zhongzheng Arts and Cultural Business District

References

External links

 

2010 establishments in Taiwan
Art centers in Taoyuan City
Event venues established in 2010